The New York University Silver School of Social Work (also commonly called Silver) provides social work education from undergraduate through doctoral levels.

About
Founded in 1960 as the NYU School of Social Work, the school was renamed the Silver School of Social Work in honor of NYU Alumni Constance and Martin Silver who, in 2007, pledged $50 million to the School of Social Work. At the time, it was the largest known donation to a school of social work in the history of the United States.

The school offers Bachelor of Science, Master of Social Work, Doctor of Philosophy and Doctorate in Clinical Social Work degree programs. In addition, the school offers four dual master's degree options: MSW/MA in Child Development with Sarah Lawrence College; MSW/JD with the NYU School of Law;  MSW/Executive MPA with the NYU Robert F. Wagner Graduate School of Public Service; and MSW/MPH with the NYU College of Global Public Health.  In 2022 the school's MSW program ranked 16th nationally. The school also serves as a postgraduate training center for practicing social workers through its continuing education certificate programs and events. 

The school has educational partnerships with approximately 600 public and non-profit agencies throughout New York metropolitan region, and offers students an array of global learning opportunities in such locations as Shanghai, Buenos Aires, London, and Glasgow. Students at the School of Social Work collectively provide more than one half-million hours of service each year through their field placements and volunteer work.

NYU Silver's Dean is Dr. Michael A. Lindsey, a leading scholar of poverty, inequality, and child and adolescent mental health. He is also the Paulette Goddard Professor of Social Work at NYU and an Aspen Health Innovators Fellow. Additionally, Dr. Lindsey led the working group of experts supporting the Congressional Black Caucus Emergency Taskforce on Black Youth Suicide and Mental Health, which created the report Ring the Alarm: The Crisis of Black Youth Suicide in America. Prior to being named NYU Silver’s Dean, Dr. Lindsey was the school's Constance and Martin Silver Professor of Poverty Studies and Executive Director of the NYU McSilver Institute for Poverty Policy and Research.

Research facilities
The school is home to several research centers and institutes, including the NYU McSilver Institute for Poverty Policy and Research, Constance and Martin Silver Center on Data Science and Social Equity, Center for Health and Aging Innovation and the Center on Violence and Recovery. In 2006, the school launched the Zelda Foster Studies Program in Palliative and End-of-Life Care, which encompasses a range of initiatives designed to develop and mentor palliative and end-of-life care (PELC) social work leaders at all stages of their careers. It is named after the social worker most closely associated with the modern-day palliative care movement, Zelda Foster, who taught in the school's Post-Masters Certificate Program in PELC from its inception in until months before her death in July 2006. 

In addition to its research institutes referenced above, NYU Silver is home to The Youth and Young Adult Mental Health Group (YYAMH-G), composed of faculty, students and invested partners dedicated to understanding the transition to adulthood among vulnerable populations of youth and young adults, and learning how to make the transition better for more young people. 

The Silver School of Social Work benefits from its access to NYU's research resources. Bobst Library at NYU is one of the largest open-stack research libraries in the nation, as it houses more than 3.3 million volumes, 20 thousand journals, and over 3.5 million microforms. There is a social work subject specialist on the library faculty who select materials and works with NYU Silver faculty and graduate students. The school itself is also home to Information for Practice, a globally focused website providing the latest news and emerging scholarship in the social work profession.

Main campus
The school's main facilities are located in the heart of NYU's Washington Square campus in Greenwich Village. The school's educational, extracurricular, and social hub is housed in three historic townhouses bordering Washington Square Park.

Satellite campuses
NYU Silver's MSW program is also available on the campuses of St. Thomas Aquinas College in Rockland County, New York; and Sarah Lawrence College in Westchester County, New York. In addition, the school offers a two-year MSW program at Shanghai and New York, in which students do their first year of coursework and field learning at NYU Shanghai and the second at the Washington Square Campus.

Student organizations
The Graduate Student Association, or GSA, is the elected student organization for Master's students. It acts as a liaison between the students and the administration and faculty of the Silver School of Social Work. GSA invites graduate students to bring feedback about the program, suggest events and come to them for direction and assistance. Similarly, the school houses an Undergraduate Student Government Association (USGA) and PhD Student Association (PHDSA) for undergraduate and PhD social work students, respectively. Organizations such as the Pi Pi Chapter of the Phi Alpha Honor Society, the Black Women's Social Work Coalition, Chinese Student Support Group, Silver Silvers, Macro Social Work Student Network, NYU CannaHealth, Sex Positive Social Work, Silver Psychoanalysis Forum, and Silver Student Association for Psychedelic Studies are among the active student-run organizations within the school.

References

External links

School of Social Work
Schools of social work in the United States
Educational institutions established in 1960
Universities and colleges in Rockland County, New York
1960 establishments in New York City